Rainsford is an English-language surname, a variation of the toponymic surname Rainford from the village Rainford, Lancashire. Other variants include Raynsford, Rainforth, and Ranford. Notable people with the Rainsford surname variant include:

 Andrew Rainsford Wetmore (1820–1892), New Brunswick politician and jurist
 Charles Rainsford (1728–1809), British Army officer
 Ed Rainsford (born 1984), Zimbabwean cricketer
 George Payne Rainsford James (1799–1860), English novelist and historical writer
 George Rainsford, Australian politician
 George Rainsford (actor), English actor
 Harold Rainsford Stark (1880–1972), officer in the United States Navy during World War I and World War II
 Jill Rainsford (1905–1994), actress, songwriter, painter and author
 Marcus Rainsford (c. 1758 – 1817) Officer in the British Army, serving in the Battle of Camden 1780, during the American Revolutionary War, and historical author
 Sir Mark Rainsford (c. 1652 – 1709), Irish Lord Mayor of Dublin and the original founder of the St James' Gate (Guinness) Brewery
 Peter Rainsford Brady (1825–1902), American military officer, surveyor and politician
 Sarah Rainsford BBC foreign correspondent
 Rainey Qualley (born 1990), singer and actress, uses the name Rainsford while releasing and writing music

Fictional characters
 Sanger Rainsford, from Richard Connell's 1924 short story "The Most Dangerous Game"

See also 
 Rainsford Historic District, group of Victorian houses in Cheyenne, Wyoming, many designed by architect George D. Rainsford
 Rainsford Island, 11-acre island in the Boston Harbor, between Long Island and Peddocks Island

See also 
 
 Rainforth, variant spelling
 Ranford (surname), variant spelling
 Raynsford, variant spelling

References 

English-language surnames
English toponymic surnames